Hazael (from the triliteral Semitic root h-z-y, "to see"; his full name meaning, "El/God has seen") was an Aramean king who is mentioned in the Bible. Under his reign, Aram-Damascus became an empire that ruled over large parts of Syria and Israel. While he was likely born in the greater Damascus region of today, his exact place of birth is still controversial, with both Bashan and the Beqaa Valley being favoured by different historians.

In the Bible

God tells Elijah the prophet of God to anoint Hazael king over Syria. Years after this, the Syrian king Ben-Hadad II, probably identical to Hadadezer mentioned in the Tel Dan Stele, was ill and sent his court official Hazael with gifts to Elijah's successor, Elisha. Elisha told Hazael to tell Hadadezer that he would recover, and he revealed to Hazael that the king would recover but would die of other means. He also predicted that Hazael would commit atrocities against the Israelites. Hazael denies that he is capable of perpetrating such deeds. Elijah predicts that Hazael will be King of Syria. The next day, he returned to Damascus, told Hadadezer he would recover but suffocated Hadadezer and seized power himself.

During his reign (c. 842–800 BCE), King Hazael led the Arameans in battle against the forces of King Jehoram of Israel and King Ahaziah of Judah. After defeating them at Ramoth-Gilead, Hazael repelled two attacks by the Assyrians, seized Israelite territory east of the Jordan River, and the Philistine city of Gath. Although unsuccessful, he also sought to take Jerusalem.

Tel Dan Stele
A monumental Aramaic inscription discovered at Tel Dan is seen by most scholars as having been erected by Hazael, after he defeated the Kings of Israel and Judah. Recent excavations at Tell es-Safi/Gath have revealed dramatic evidence of the siege and subsequent conquest of Gath by Hazael. An archaeomagnetic study has suggested that the sites of Tell Zeitah, Tel Rehov and Horvat Tevet were destroyed by Hazael's campaign. King Joash of Judah forestalled Hazael's invasion by bribing him with treasure from the royal palace and temple.

Items belonging to Hazael

Bronze plaques

Decorated bronze plaques from chariot horse-harness taken from Hazael, identified by their inscriptions, have been found as re-gifted votive objects at two Greek sites, the Heraion of Samos and in the temple of Apollo at Eretria on Euboea.  The inscriptions read "that which Hadad gave to our lord Hazael from 'Umq in the year that our lord crossed the River". The river must be the Orontes. The triangular front pieces show a "Master of the animals" gripping inverted sphinxes or lions in either hand, and with goddesses who stand on the heads of lions. When Tiglath-Pileser III took Damascus in 733/2, these heirlooms were part of the loot that fell eventually into Greek, probably Euboean hands.

Arslan Tash ivories
A set of ivory bed decorations were found in 1928 in Arslan Tash in northern Syria (ancient Hadātu) by a team of French archaeologists. Among them is the Arslan Tash ivory inscription in Aramaic language that carries the name 'Hazael'; this bed seems to have belonged to king Hazael of Aram-Damascus. The inscription is known as KAI 232.

Also, some fragmentary ivories mentioning Hazael were found in Nimrud, in Iraq.

See also

 List of biblical figures identified in extra-biblical sources
 List of Syrian monarchs
 Timeline of Syrian history

Notes

References
 Biran, A., and Naveh, J. 1995. The Tel Dan Inscription: A New Fragment. Israel Exploration Journal 45(1):1–18.
 Ephal, I., and Naveh, J. 1989. Hazael's booty inscriptions. Israel Exploration Journal 39(3–4):192–200.
 Lemaire, A. 1991. Hazaël, de Damas, Roi d’Aram. Pp. 91–108 in Marchands, Diplomates et Empereurs, Etudes sur la civilisation mésopotamienne offertes à P. Garelli. Paris: Editions Recherche sur la Civilisations.
 Maeir, A. 2004. The Historical Background and Dating of Amos VI 2: An Archaeological Perspective from Tell es-Safi/Gath. Vetus Testamentum 54(3):319–34.
 Galil, G., "David and Hazael: War, Peace, Stones and Memory," Palestine Exploration Quarterly, 139,2 (2007), 79–84.
 Maeir, A. M., and Gur-Arieh, S. 2011. Comparative aspects of the Aramean Siege System at Tell es-Sa¦fi/Gath. Pp. 227–44 in The Fire Signals of Lachish: Studies in the Archaeology and History of Israel in the Late Bronze Age, Iron Age and Persian Period in Honor of David Ussishkin, eds. I. Finkelstein and N. Na’aman. Winona Lake, IN: Eisenbrauns.

External links

Tell es-Safi/Gath Excavation Project Blog
Tell es-Safi/Gath Excavation Project website
Tel Dan Inscription Webpage

Monarchs of the Hebrew Bible
796 BC deaths
9th-century BC Kings of Syria
8th-century BC Kings of Syria
9th-century BC biblical rulers
Aramean kings
Ancient Damascus
Year of birth unknown
Kings of Syria
Biblical murderers
Gath (city)